Dāvis Ikaunieks (born 7 January 1994, in Kuldīga) is a Latvian footballer playing as an attacking midfielder for FK Jablonec and the Latvia national football team.

Club career

FK Jablonec
On 20 June 2018 Ikaunieks signed a three-year deal with Czech First league team FK Jablonec.  After spending half a season on loan at FK RFS in Latvia, at the end of 2019 he went on loan to FC Fastav Zlín.

International career

International goals
Scores and results list Latvia's goal tally first.

Personal life
His younger brother Jānis is also a professional footballer, currently playing for Rīgas FS.

Honours

Club
Liepājas Metalurgs II

 Latvian First League: 2012
FK Liepāja
 Latvian Higher League: 2015
Rīgas FS

 Latvian Football Cup: 2019

International
Latvia

 Baltic Cup: 2016
 Baltic Cup runner up: 2022

Individual
 Latvian Higher League top scorer: 2015 (15 goals)
 Latvian Footballer of the Year: 2018

References

External links
 
 
 

1994 births
Living people
People from Kuldīga
Latvian footballers
Association football midfielders
FK Liepājas Metalurgs players
FK Liepāja players
FC Vysočina Jihlava players
FK Jablonec players
FK RFS players
FC Fastav Zlín players
Czech First League players
Latvian Higher League players
Latvian expatriate footballers
Latvia international footballers
Expatriate footballers in the Czech Republic
Latvian expatriate sportspeople in the Czech Republic
FK Mladá Boleslav players